Vergara may refer to:

Law
 Vergara v. California, California court case regarding education
 Convention of Vergara, a 19th-century treaty ending the First Carlist War in Spain

Places
 Vergara, Spanish-language name of Bergara, Gipuzkoa Province, Basque Country
 Vergara, Uruguay
 Vergara, Cundinamarca, Colombia
 Los Vergara, Jalisco, Mexico
 Vergara River, Chile
 Augusto Vergara Airport, an airport serving the city of Los Santos, Panama
 Quinta Vergara, a park in Viña del Mar, Chile
 Quinta Vergara Amphitheater, an open-air theatre within Quinta Vergara

Surname

Vergara is a Basque surname that has its origins in Gipuzkoa. Notable people with the surname include:
 Adán Vergara (born 1981), Chilean footballer
 Al Vergara (born 1979), Filipino basketball player
 Alina Vergara (born 1966), Argentine field hockey player
 Andrea Tessa Vergara (born 1961), Chilean singer-songwriter
 Arnao de Vergara (ca.1490–ca.1557), Spanish master glassmaker
 Benito Vergara (1934–2015), Filipino plant scientist
 Bernardo Vergara (cartoonist) (born 1966), Spanish comic artist and writer
 Camilo José Vergara (born 1944), Chilean-American writer and photographer
 Carlo Vergara (born 1971), Filipino graphic designer and illustrator
 Carmen Gisela Vergara, Panamanian lawyer and politician
 César Vergara (born 1982), Chilean football (soccer) player
 Cristóbal Vergara (born 1994), Chilean football (soccer) player
 Duván Vergara (born 1996), Colombian football (soccer) player
 Fernando Vergara (born 1970), Chilean football (soccer) player and manager
 Francisco de Vergara (died 1545), Spanish Hellenist and humanist, brother of Juan de Vergara
 Francisco Javier Vergara y Velasco (1860–1914), Colombian geographer, cartographer and historian
 Francisco Ortiz de Vergara (1524–1574), Spanish conquistador and colonizer
 Gabriela Vergara (born 1974), Venezuelan actress and model
 George Vergara (1901–1982), American NFL football player and politician
 Gladys Vergara (1928–2016), Uruguayan astronomer
 Héctor Vergara (born 1966), Canadian soccer referee
 Ignacio Vergara (1715–1776), Spanish Baroque sculptor
 Ivette Vergara (born 1972), Chilean journalist and presenter
 Jherson Vergara (born 1994), Colombian football (soccer) player
 Joane Vergara (born 1990), Puerto Rican handball player
 John Paul Vergara, Filipino scientist and professor
 Jorge Vergara (1955–2019), Mexican businessman
 José Vergara (boxer) (born 1915), Chilean boxer
 José Ignacio Flores de Vergara y Ximénez de Cárdenas (1733–1786), known as the "Pacificator of Peru"
 José María Vergara y Vergara (1831–1872), Colombian diplomat, politician, journalist and writer
 Juan de Vergara (1492–1557), Spanish humanist, brother of Francisco de Vergara
 Juan José Gurruchaga Vergara (born 1982), Chilean actor and TV presenter
 Juan Pablo Vergara (1985–2019), Peruvian football (soccer) player
 Lalaine Vergara-Paras (born 1987), American television actress
 Luis Enrique Vergara (1922–1970), Mexican filmmaker
 Mario Vergara (1910–1950), Italian Roman Catholic priest and beatified martyr
 Marta Vergara (1898–1995), Chilean author, journalist and women's rights activist
 Mónica Vergara (born 1983), Mexican football (soccer) player
 Mylo Hubert Vergara (born 1962), Filipino Catholic bishop
 Nicolás de Vergara el Mozo (1540–1606), Spanish architect, sculptor and glassmaker
 Nisim Vergara (born 1998), Argentine football (soccer) player
 Omar Vergara (1943–2018), Argentine Olympic fencer
 Pablo Vergara (born 1988), Argentine football (soccer) player
 Pablo Vergara (sport shooter) (born 1954), Chilean sports shooter
 Patri Vergara, Spanish veterinarian and professor
 Pedro Nolasco Cruz Vergara (1857–1939), Chilean literary critic, novelist, writer and politician
 Pilar Vergara (born 1947), Chilean journalist
 Sandra Vergara (born 1988), Colombian model and actress
 Sergio Vergara (disambiguation), several people with the name
 Sofía Vergara (born 1972), Colombian supermodel and actress
 Unai Vergara (born 1977), Spanish football (soccer) player
 Valentín Vergara (1879–1930), Argentine national deputy and governor of the Province of Buenos Aires

See also
 Bergara (disambiguation)

Basque-language surnames